The Maguo River Bridge is a beam bridge in Fumin County, Kunming, Yunnan, China. The bridge is part of the Jiaozishan highway.

See also
List of highest bridges in the world

References

Bridges in Yunnan
Bridges completed in 2012
Transport in Kunming